The 2011 Open de la Réunion was the first edition of the tournament. All semifinal matches were cancelled by the supervisor, due to heavy rain and flooding.

Seeds
All seeds received a bye into the second round.

Draw

Draw

Notes

References
 Doubles Draw

Open de la Reunion - Doubles
2011 in Réunion